Nauna may be,

Nauna language, New Guinea
Nauna language (Brazil)
Ñauña, Andes mountain